Nandamuri Kalyan Ram (born 5 July 1978) is an Indian actor and film producer who works in Telugu cinema. He is the son of late actor-politician Nandamuri Harikrishna. Ram is best known for his roles in action films such as Athanokkade, Hare Ram and 118. Ram is the chairperson of the production company N. T. R. Arts, named after his paternal grandfather NTR.

He also owns "Advitha Creative Studios", a video effects company, which provided special effects for movies such as Legend, Nannaku Prematho and Krishnashtami.

Early life
Kalyan Ram was born in Hyderabad, Telangana, to Nandamuri Harikrishna and his first wife, Lakshmi Kumari. He is the grandson of N. T. Rama Rao. His half-brother, N. T. Rama Rao Jr., is also an actor. Ram was schooled at St. Pauls, Hyderabad and KCP Siddardha Adarsh Residential School, Vijayawada. He obtained his engineering degree in Coimbatore and completed masters in Illinois Institute of Technology, Chicago. Though he desired to join the film industry immediately after engineering, he pursued masters on the insistence of Harikrishna who wanted him to be first person in their family to study masters.

Career

In 1989 Ram acted with his uncle Nandamuri Balakrishna in the film  Bala Gopaludu as a child artist. Later,he started his acting career in 2003 with Toli Choopulone followed by Abhimanyu, which were both commercial failures. In 2005, he established his own banner N.T.R. Arts under the name of his grandfather N. T. Rama Rao known as 'NTR'. He then produced Athanokkade, which introduced Surender Reddy as a director, and it was a critical and commercial success. His next films Asadhyudu, Vijayadasami and Lakshmi Kalyanam bombed at the box office. However, his 2008 release Hare Ram became a critical and commercial success. His 2009 release Jayeebhava and 2010 release Kalyanram Kathi emerged as commercial failures. In 2013, Ram produced and starred in Om 3D which was touted as India's first 3D action film and was released in late summer 2013. Despite the hype, the film ended up as a commercial failure.

In 2015, Ram starred in Pataas which turned out to be a blockbuster with positive reviews. For the first time, he produced a film without himself as the lead, titled Kick 2 under N.T.R. Arts. It stars Ravi Teja as a lead, and is directed by Surender Reddy, which turned out to be a flop at the box office. Ram's later release for 2015 featuring him as the lead was Sher opposite actress Sonal Chauhan. It was directed by Mallikarjun and was produced by Vijayalakshmi Pictures.

In 2016, Ram produced and starred in Puri Jagannadh's Ism as an undercover journalist. In 2018, he acted the lead role in the film MLA and Naa Nuvve. In 2019, he played the role of his father Nandamuri Harikrishna in the films N.T.R: Kathanayakudu and N.T.R: Mahanayakudu. He then proceeded to star in K. V. Guhan's 118 along with Shalini Pandey and Nivetha Thomas. The film became a critical and commercial success.

Ram's next release was the 2020 film Entha Manchivaadavuraa directed by Satish Vegesna of Sathamanam Bhavati fame. It is an official remake of the Gujarati-language film Oxygen.

Personal life 
Ram married Swathi on 9 August 2006. They have two children, a son and a daughter.

Filmography

As an actor

As a producer

Television

Notes

References

External links
Nandamuri Kalyan Ram on Facebook
N.T.R. Arts on YouTube
 

Living people
1978 births
20th-century Indian male actors
Illinois Institute of Technology alumni
Indian film producers
Indian Hindus
Telugu male actors
Male actors in Telugu cinema
Male actors from Hyderabad, India